The 1992 Badminton World Cup was the fourteenth edition of an international tournament Badminton World Cup. The event was held in Guangzhou, China in from 19 August to 23 August 1992. Indonesia won the men's singles and mixed doubles events while China won both the women's events. Malaysia secured a title in men's doubles discipline.

Medalists

Men's singles

Finals

Women's singles

Finals

Men's doubles

Finals

Women's doubles

Finals

Mixed doubles

Finals

References 

 https://web.archive.org/web/20061214225142/http://tangkis.tripod.com/world/1992.htm
 http://www.kompasdata.id/Search/NewsDetail/18823871

Badminton World Cup
1992 in badminton
1992 in Chinese sport
Sport in Guangzhou
International sports competitions hosted by China
Badminton tournaments in China